Zodarion granulatum is a spider species found in Cyprus, Greece, Turkey, Lebanon, and Israel.

Description
Prosoma female: yellowish-brown, male: densely granulated, dark brown, median, and eye field black. Legs female: yellow, male: yellow-brown. Femur male: brown. Opisthosoma female: uniform purple-brown, laterally with big light brown spots, male: shining black, dorsally granulated, dark purple to light brown laterally and ventrally.

Body length male: 2.5 mm
Body length female: 2.3 mm

See also 
 List of Zodariidae species

References

External links 

granulatum
Spiders of Europe
Spiders of Asia
Fauna of Lebanon
Arthropods of Turkey
Spiders described in 1908